Homer Virgil Milton Miller (April 29, 1814 – May 31, 1896) was an American physician and politician from the U.S. state of Georgia, who practiced medicine for the Confederacy in the American Civil War and served as a U.S. Senator from Georgia for seven days in 1871.

Born in Pendleton, South Carolina on April 29, 1814, Miller moved with his parents to Rabun County, Georgia in 1820. He attended the common schools and graduated from the Medical College of South Carolina in 1835. He continued medical studies in Paris and commenced practice in Cassville, Georgia, in 1838. Miller was an unsuccessful Whig candidate for election as a U.S. Representative to the twenty-ninth United States Congress in 1844.

Miller was a slave owner. In 1840, he owned 10 slaves. In 1850, he owned 3 slaves. In 1860, he owned 20 slaves.

During the Civil War, Miller served in the Confederate army as a surgeon and as a medical director, surgeon of posts, and inspector of hospitals in Georgia. He resumed the practice of medicine in Rome, Georgia and was a member of the faculty of the Atlanta Medical College. Subsequently, he was trustee of the University of Georgia in Athens.

Miller was a member of the state Reconstruction convention in 1867. Upon the restoration of Georgia's congressional representation, Miller was elected as a Democrat to the U.S. Senate on July 28, 1868. However, he did not qualify (and thus was not seated) until February 24, 1871. He served until the end of his term on March 3, 1871.

Miller's tenure in the Senate, at a mere seven days long, ranks (as of 2021) as the third-shortest in American history and the shortest for those who won a full term. The shortest Senate tenure belongs to Sen. Rebecca Latimer Felton from Georgia, who served for only one day from her appointment on November 21, 1922, to November 22, 1922. (The second tenure of Sen. Salmon P. Chase from Ohio is shorter, lasting two days from the beginning of his term on March 4, 1861, to his resignation on March 6, 1861; however, Chase had previously already served a full term from March 4, 1849, to March 3, 1855, so he is not the shortest-serving senator.) The fourth-shortest Senate tenure belongs to Sen. Alva M. Lumpkin from South Carolina, who served three days longer than Miller; he served for ten days from his appointment on July 22, 1941, to his death on August 1, 1941.

Miller died in Atlanta on May 31, 1896, and was interred in Myrtle Hill Cemetery in Rome, Georgia.

References

External links

1814 births
1896 deaths
People from Pendleton, South Carolina
Georgia (U.S. state) Whigs
19th-century American politicians
Georgia (U.S. state) Democrats
Democratic Party United States senators from Georgia (U.S. state)
Confederate States Army surgeons
People of Georgia (U.S. state) in the American Civil War
People from Rome, Georgia
American slave owners
United States senators who owned slaves